KBWV-LP (101.5 FM) is a radio station licensed to serve Bacavi, Arizona.  The station is owned by The Path Inc. It airs a Variety music format.

The station was assigned the KBWV-LP call letters by the Federal Communications Commission on September 18, 2003.

Construction permit
On December 3, 2007, the FCC issued the station a construction permit to change its community of license to Kykotsmovi Village, Arizona, with a rise in effective radiated power to 100 watts and a lowering of the antenna's height above average terrain to -22.3 meters (-72 feet). The new transmitter location would be 35°52'53"N, 110°36'27"W. This construction permit expires on June 3, 2009.

References

External links
 
 KBWV-LP service area per the FCC database

BWV-LP
BWV-LP
Mass media in Navajo County, Arizona